Joseph Fornance (October 18, 1804 – November 24, 1852) was a Democratic member of the U.S. House of Representatives from Pennsylvania.

Biography
Joseph Fornance born in Lower Merion Township, Pennsylvania.  He studied law, was admitted to the bar in 1832, and commenced practice in Norristown, Pennsylvania.  He served as president of the council of the Borough of Norristown.  He was a member of the Pennsylvania House of Representatives in 1834.

Congress
Fornance was elected as a Democrat to the Twenty-sixth and Twenty-seventh Congresses.  He was not a candidate for renomination in 1842.  He resumed the practice of his profession, and died in Norristown in 1852.  He was interred in Montgomery Cemetery, in West Norriton Township, Montgomery County, Pennsylvania, near Norristown.

Fornance nominated future Civil War Major General and Democratic presidential candidate Winfield Scott Hancock for the United States Military Academy at West Point.

Sources

The Political Graveyard

1804 births
1852 deaths
Democratic Party members of the United States House of Representatives from Pennsylvania
People from Lower Merion Township, Pennsylvania
Democratic Party members of the Pennsylvania House of Representatives
Pennsylvania lawyers
Burials in Pennsylvania
19th-century American politicians
19th-century American lawyers